Klaus Schulze (4 August 1947 – 26 April 2022) was a German electronic music pioneer, composer and musician. He also used the alias Richard Wahnfried and was a member of the Krautrock bands Tangerine Dream, Ash Ra Tempel, and The Cosmic Jokers before launching a solo career consisting of more than 60 albums released across six decades.

Early life 
Schulze was born in Berlin in 1947. His father was a writer and his mother a ballet dancer. After graduating from high school, he delivered telegrams and studied German at the Technical University of Berlin. He and his wife Elfie had two sons, Maximilian and Richard.

Career

1970s
In 1969, Schulze was the drummer of one of the early incarnations of Tangerine Dream - one of the most famous bands that got the nickname "Krautrock" in English speaking countries (others included Kraftwerk and Popul Vuh) - for their debut album Electronic Meditation. Before 1969 he was a drummer in a band called Psy Free. He met Edgar Froese from Tangerine Dream in the Zodiac Club in what was then West Berlin. In 1970 he left this group to form Ash Ra Tempel with Manuel Göttsching and Hartmut Enke.  In 1971, he chose again to leave a newly formed group after only one album, this time to mount a solo career. In 1972, Schulze released his debut album Irrlicht with organ and a recording of an orchestra filtered almost beyond recognition.  Despite the lack of synthesizers, this proto-ambient work is regarded as a milestone in electronic music.  His follow-up album, Cyborg, was similar but added the EMS VCS 3 synthesizer.

Since this point, Schulze's career was the most prolific, such that he could claim more than 40 original albums to his name since Irrlicht. Highlights of these include 1975's Timewind, 1976's Moondawn (his first album to feature the Moog synthesizer), 1979's Dune, and 1995's double-album In Blue (which featured one long track called "Return to the Tempel" with electric guitar contributions from his friend Manuel Göttsching of Ash Ra Tempel). In 1976, he was drafted by Japanese percussionist and composer Stomu Yamashta to join his short-lived "supergroup" Go, also featuring Steve Winwood, Michael Shrieve, and Al Di Meola. They released two studio albums (Go in 1976 and Go Too in 1977) and one live album (Go Live from Paris, 1976).

Throughout the 1970s he followed closely in the footsteps of Tangerine Dream, albeit with far lighter sequencer lines and a more reflective, dreamy sheen, not unlike the ambient music of his contemporary Brian Eno. On occasions he would also compose film scores, including horror and thriller movies such as Barracuda (1978) and Next of Kin (1982). Some of his lighter albums are appreciated by new-age music fans, despite the fact that Schulze has always denied connections to this genre. By mid-decade, with the release of Timewind and Moondawn, his style transformed from Krautrock to Berlin School.

Schulze had a more organic sound than other electronic artists of the time. Often he would throw in decidedly non-electronic sounds, such as acoustic guitar and a male operatic voice in Blackdance, or a cello in Dune (1979) and Trancefer. Schulze developed a Minimoog patch that sounds uncannily like an electric guitar. Schulze often takes German events as a starting point for his compositions, a notable example being on his 1978 album "X" (the title signifying it was his tenth album), subtitled "Six Musical Biographies", a reference to such notables as Ludwig II of Bavaria, Friedrich Nietzsche, Georg Trakl, and Wilhelm Friedemann Bach. His use of the pseudonym Richard Wahnfried is indicative of his interest in Richard Wagner, a clear influence on some albums like the aforementioned Timewind.

Schulze built a record studio in Hambühren, Germany.

1980s
In the 1980s Schulze started using digital instruments besides the usual analog synthesizers, and his work accordingly became less experimental and more accessible. Although the switch to using digital equipment is audible in the style of Dig It (1980), it was not until the release of Trancefer (1981) that the shift in style became evident.

This newer style can also be found in Schulze's next release Audentity. Both "Cellistica" and "Spielglocken" are composed in a similar sequencer-based style as on Trancefer, but this is certainly not the case of all of Audentitys tracks; indeed, "Sebastian im Traum" hints towards the operatic style to be found in some of Schulze's much later works. The predominance of sequencing can also be found in the follow-up live album Dziękuję Poland Live '83, although many of its tracks are re-workings of those to be found on Audentity. Schulze's next studio-based album was Angst (soundtrack to the namesake 1983 film). The cold yet haunting electronic rhythms generate an alienated atmosphere. Typical are the Fairlight synth and Linn electronic drums sounds.

Another highlight of this era was En=Trance with the dreamy cut "FM Delight". The album Miditerranean Pads marked the beginning of very complex percussion arrangements that continued through the next two decades.

In 1989, German band Alphaville released their album The Breathtaking Blue, on which Klaus Schulze was both a contributing musician and the album's producer.

1990s
Starting with Beyond Recall, the first half of the 1990s was his "sample" period, when Schulze used a wide variety of prerecorded sounds such as screeching birds and sensuous female moans in his studio albums and live performances. Sampling heavily died down with his 1995 album In Blue. The decade also saw the release of copious amounts of previously unreleased material, of varying quality, in several limited-edition boxed sets.

2000s

In 2005 he began re-releasing his classic solo and Wahnfried albums with bonus tracks of unreleased material recorded at roughly the same time as the original works. In the latter part of the decade, Schulze produced albums and staged numerous live appearances with Lisa Gerrard.

2010s
Big in Japan: Live in Tokyo 2010 was Schulze's fortieth album, and its release in September 2010 marked the beginning of his fifth decade as a solo musician.  The Japan concerts were to be his last live performances. 

His next album, Shadowlands, was released in February 2013, quickly to be followed by the release of The Schulze–Schickert Session 1975, a rare long-unreleased collaboration, in March 2013.  After a hiatus of several years, he returned to the studio in 2018 for another album, Silhouettes.  Much of the album was recorded in a single take.

2020s
Schulze died on 26 April 2022 following a long illness.  His final album, Deus Arrakis, was released on 1 July 2022.

Richard Wahnfried
Richard Wahnfried, then simply Wahnfried after 1993, is the longtime and only real alias for Klaus Schulze – originally a pseudonym, later an official side project name. Seven albums were released under this name between 1979 and 1997.

The main characteristics of the Wahnfried albums (as opposed to Schulze's regular works) are:

 Often being oriented towards more mainstream genres (some would say "more commercial"), such as rock, dance, techno, and trance.
 Always allowing for collaborative and less electronic albums, with known or unknown guest musicians performing along with Schulze's synths.

The pseudonym's etymology stems from Schulze's love for Richard Wagner:
 Richard, evidently from Wagner's first name. Richard is also the name of Schulze's first son.
 Wahnfried ("Peace from delusion and/or madness", in German), from the name Wagner gave to his villa in Bayreuth (and where he was later buried).

In his 1975 album Timewind (four years before the first alias use), Schulze had already named a track "Wahnfried 1883" (in reference to Wagner's death and burial in his Wahnfried's garden in 1883). The other track on Timewind is called "Bayreuth Return". After 1993, the albums are simply credited to "Wahnfried", and namedrop Schulze ("featuring Klaus Schulze", "Produced by Klaus Schulze").

"Wahnfried" is the only known alias of Schulze (albeit on the 1998 Tribute to Klaus Schulze album, among 10 other artists, Schulze contributed one track barely hidden behind the "Schulzendorfer Groove Orchester" pseudonym).

Discography

Albums 
Schulze's concert performances are original compositions recorded live and thus listed as albums. An intensive reissue program of Schulze CDs began in 2005, with most releases having bonus tracks, and sometimes additional discs. They are published by the label Revisited Records (a division of German company InsideOut Music), and distributed by SPV.

Source:

Singles

(Richard) Wahnfried albums
Composed by Schulze and performed with guest artists under alias Richard Wahnfried or later just Wahnfried:

Notes
This album was originally issued as the third disc of Contemporary Works I.

Boxed sets
Between 1993 and 2002 Klaus Schulze released several limited edition boxed sets, all composed of non-album material.

Notes
Collecting Silver, Historic, and Jubilee sets, with additional 5 discs.
A bonus sixth disc included with the first 333 copies.

Reissues from sets
Sources:

"The Dark Side of the Moog"
"The Dark Side of the Moog" is a Klaus Schulze collaboration with Pete Namlook (joined also by Bill Laswell on volumes four to seven). Each title is a distortion of Pink Floyd song and album titles.

Source:

The Evolution of the Dark Side of the Moog is a compilation album, containing excerpts from the first eight volumes. The series was announced as officially concluded with volume ten when on 21 March 2005 at 14:52 CET, Pete Namlook sold the Big Moog synthesizer that was the symbol of the series. Volume eleven appeared on Namlook's website on 15 April 2008 (and was included in a complete box set).

Collaborations
Source:

Promos
 2003 Andromeda
 2004 Ion
 2009 Hommage à Polska (with Lisa Gerrard)

Compilations
 1979 Rock On Brain
 1980 Star Action
 1988 History (for promotional use, limited to 1,000 copies)
 1991 2001
 1994 The Essential 72–93
 1999 Trailer

See also
 Berlin School of electronic music
 Kosmische Musik
 Urs Amann, illustrator of Schulze's early records

References

Further reading

External links
 
 
 

1947 births
2022 deaths
Brain Records artists
German electronic musicians
German trance musicians
Island Records artists
Krautrock
Musicians from Berlin
Musical groups from Berlin
Ohr label artists
PolyGram artists
SPV GmbH artists
Tangerine Dream members
Virgin Records artists
ZYX Music artists